On the evening of June 20, 1957, a violent and deadly F5 tornado struck the north side and downtown area of Fargo, North Dakota as well as the area north of Moorhead, Minnesota. It was part of a family of five devastating tornadoes produced by one supercell over the course of 3.5 hours, although they are listed as one continuous tornado. A total of 10 people (some sources say 12) were killed, making it the deadliest tornado in North Dakota history. Meanwhile, 103 others were injured, and damage was estimated at $25.25 million (1957 USD). It was part of a larger outbreak sequence of 23 tornadoes that affected the Midwest and Great Plains.

Tornado event
The F5 tornado that hit Fargo was the third in the tornado family that moved from Central North Dakota to Central Minnesota, as well as the strongest and most catastrophic. The tornado was sighted as a funnel cloud above Mapleton, North Dakota at 6:25 PM on June 20, 1957. It then crossed the Red River into Northeastern Moorhead, Minnesota, before occluding northward and dissipating. It also at times moved at a painfully slow , which no doubt played a role in how destructive it was. In addition, the communities of Wheatland, North Dakota, Casselton, North Dakota, Glyndon, Minnesota, and Dale, Minnesota were damaged from F0, F2, F4, and F3 tornadoes, respectively. The F0 and F2 tornadoes occurred before the Fargo F5 tornado, while the F4 and F3 tornadoes occurred afterwards with all of them happening over a time period of 3.5 hours from 4:40 to 8:10 PM CDT. However, the event is officially listed as one long-tracked F5 tornado.

Damage was extensive and included 100 blocks of North Fargo. Approximately 329 homes were destroyed and some of them were completely swept off their foundations. An additional 1,035 homes were damaged. The worst residential damage occurred in the Golden Ridge Subdivision (today the Madison Elementary School district) near 25th Street North, much of which was swept away and scattered across a nearby farm field. A total of 15 farm homes were destroyed and 25 others damaged. Four churches and three schools, including Shanley High School, Sacred Heart Academy, and buildings on the North Dakota Agricultural College campus were also severely damaged. It also damaged 15 businesses that were destroyed and 30 others that suffered major damage. These were mainly small local shops. A total of 200 automobiles were destroyed and 300 damaged.

Casualties
Ten people lost their lives in the immediate aftermath of the storm, making it the deadliest tornado in North Dakota history. Two more people later died likely due to injuries sustained in the tornado, but were not counted in the official death toll. All those killed were residents of the Golden Ridge neighborhood, described as a predominantly working-class neighborhood of modest, but cheaply built homes, only a handful of which had basements. An additional 103 people were injured. Because of the tornado's relatively slow speed, later determined to have been hardly exceeding 10 mph, many neighborhood residents fled the area in their cars before the storm hit. Others were not so lucky. At the western edge of Golden Ridge, Donald and Betty Titgen were in their mobile home when the tornado struck. Donald was killed instantly, while Betty was gravely injured. She remained in a coma for until her death in January 1960. Their two young daughters, who had been in the care of an aunt that day, were later raised by relatives. Two blocks to the east of the Titgens, Theodore and Teresa Udahl and their eight-year-old daughter Mary Jean were also killed when their home was swept away. In the confusion afterwards, Theodore and Teresa were mistakenly identified as another couple, while Mary Jean, whose body was found almost a block away from where the Udahl home had stood, was not properly identified until the next day. 69-year-old Laura Schoenherr, who lived one block east of the Udahls, and like the Titgens also lived in a mobile home. She'd been trying to take shelter in her daughter's home next door when the tornado struck. She suffered terrible injuries which later led to a leg being amputated and the loss of function in one arm, and she later died in hospital about three weeks after the tornado on July 15.

The Munson family
The remaining six fatalities together were the most tragic losses exacted by the storm, as they all came from a single family. In the summer of 1957, Gerald and Mercedes Munson lived at the far eastern edge of Golden Ridge with their seven children; Phyllis, LeRoy, Darwin, Bradley, Jeanette, Lois Ann and Mary Beth, whose ages at the time were 16, 14, 12, 10, 5, 2 and 16 months respectively. On June 20, Gerald was in Bismarck, North Dakota for his job as a truck driver, while Mercedes was also at her job as a bartender. LeRoy was babysitting for a neighbor while Phyllis was at home with the younger children. That day had also been Mercedes' 36th birthday and she had arranged to leave work early to celebrate her birthday with her children. However, the co-worker who was supposed to cover her shift had been running late, and when Mercedes first heard the storm warnings she called home to check on her children. Phyllis answered the phone, screaming "Mother, it's hitting!" before the line went dead.

Mercedes quickly caught a ride across town in an effort to reach her children, only to find her neighborhood in ruins. After finding LeRoy unharmed, a neighbor told her to head for a hospital, which she did along with a friend who gave her a ride. As the evening progressed the two women went back and forth between the city's two main hospitals, St. John's and St. Luke's, until before long she learned the horrible truth. Her family's home had been directly in the path of the tornado, and like most homes in the neighborhood did not have a basement. Phyllis and her five younger siblings had tried to take shelter under a table, which provided little shelter when the house collapsed upon them. Mercedes first identified Phyllis, Jeanette and Mary Beth in the basement morgue at St. John's hospital, while Lois Ann had been found alive but gravely injured. Meanwhile, at St. Luke's she identified Bradley in the morgue, and was informed that Darwin had also survived but like Lois Ann, was also severely injured. Mercedes was not allowed to see either of them. Darwin died from his injuries just before midnight, while Lois Ann died at 2:30 am the following morning.

The following morning, the deaths of the six Munson children dominated many headlines regarding the tornado as the disaster made headlines in newspapers across the country. Included in the story of the Munsons was a photograph taken by Fargo Forum photographer Cal Olson, showing 21-year-old Richard Shaw, a neighbor of the Munsons, carrying the body of Jeanette Munson out of the wreckage of their home. The photograph was hailed as symbolizing in raw detail the true horror experienced by Fargo in the wake of the tornado, and the following year helped the Forum win a Pulitzer Prize. Gerald Munson came to learn the fate of six of his children the following morning. The evening before he'd heard about the tornado on television but was unable to reach his wife by phone as the lines were down. The next morning, when reading the morning edition of The Bismarck Tribune, he immediately recognized his last name repeated six times in the list of victims, after which he stated aloud "Those are my children. Why did this happen to me? I thought the world of those kids!"

Legacy
After 1971, when Dr. Ted Fujita introduced his scale that rates tornadoes based on the damage they cause, the Fargo tornado received an F5 rating, the highest level.

The Fargo tornado is considered the most devastating in North Dakota history, and was one of only two F5 tornadoes that have struck the state, the other occurring four years earlier in 1953. It was the northernmost confirmed F5 tornado until the Elie, Manitoba Tornado on June 22, 2007. The Fargo area was also hit by F3 tornadoes on June 13, 1950, August 30, 1956, and June 15, 1973, but none of these caused any fatalities.

In June 2007, the 50th anniversary of the Fargo tornado was commemorated by the Fargo Forum, which ran a week-long series of stories on the tornado.

In 2010, North Dakota Associate Poet Laureate Jamie Parsley authored a book about the Fargo tornado entitled Fargo, 1957: An Elegy, which was published by the Institute for Regional Studies at North Dakota State University in Fargo.

In 2019, the Cass Act Players performed a musical based on the events of the tornado called "Weather the Storm" at Bonanzaville Museum in West Fargo, ND.

An image of the tornado is featured on the cover of the 1984 album Couldn't Stand the Weather by Stevie Ray Vaughan and Double Trouble.

See also
List of North American tornadoes and tornado outbreaks
List of F5 and EF5 tornadoes

References

External links
  Video of Fargo Tornado

F5 tornadoes
Tornadoes of 1957
Tornadoes in North Dakota
Tornadoes in Minnesota
1957 natural disasters in the United States
June 1957 events in the United States
1957 in North Dakota
1957 in Minnesota